Aljmaš is a village in the Erdut municipality in eastern Croatia. Aljmaš lies on the right bank of the Danube.

History
Aljmaš was reportedly the sight of a Marian apparition and since 1704, a significant number of believers and tourists make a pilgrimage here annually. A Catholic Church in the name of Our Lady of Laus and Our Lady of Consolation was constructed in 1864. During the Croatian War of Independence, the Roman Catholic church in Aljmaš was destroyed and rebuilt almost completely in 2006.

See also
Erdut Municipality

References

External links

Populated places in Osijek-Baranja County
Populated places on the Danube
Croatia–Serbia border